Amanda Bateman (born 3 July 1996) is an Australian representative rower. She is a national champion, has represented at underage and senior world championships and is a 2021 Tokyo Olympian where she competed in the Australian women's double-scull.

Club and state rowing
Born in Melbourne, Bateman was educated at Firbank Girls' Grammar School. Her senior club rowing has been from the Mercantile Rowing Club in Melbourne. She is the younger sister of Katrina Bateman who is also an elite rower who has competed for Mercantile, her state of Victoria and Australia.

Amanda's state representative debut for Victoria came in 2016 in the women's youth eight which contested and placed second in the Bicentennial Cup at the Interstate Regatta. In 2018 she rowed in the four seat of the Victorian women's eight which won the Queen's Cup at the Interstate Regatta.
 In 2021 she won another Queen's Cup in the five seat of the Victorian women's eight.

Bateman raced in Mercantile colours contesting the open women's coxed eight event at the 2017 Australian Rowing Championships. In 2018 and 2019 she raced in Mercantile quad sculls for the open women's quad scull title. In 2021 she won Australian Championship titles in the open women's single scull and in a double scull with Tara Rigney. In that same regatta in a quad scull she finished in second place contesting the 2021 open women's quad title.

International representative rowing
Bateman made her Australian representative debut at the 2013 Junior World Rowing Championships in Trakai Lithuania where she rowed in the Australian quad scull to a seventh placing. In 2014 she again raced at the Junior World Rowing Championships in Hamburg where she rowed the single scull to a sixteenth placing.

In 2017 she was picked for the World Rowing U23 Championships in Plovdiv where she rowed in the three seat of the coxless four to an eighth placing.

In 2019 Bateman moved into Australia's senior women's squad for the international season. Rowing with Genevieve Horton she rowed the Australian women's double scull to a bronze medal at the World Rowing Cup II in Poznan and to a silver medal at WRC III in Rotterdam. Bateman and Horton were selected to race Australia's double scull at the 2019 World Rowing Championships in Linz, Austria. The double were looking for a top eleven finish at the 2019 World Championships to qualify for the Tokyo Olympics.  They won their heat and placed fourth in their semi-final. They finished fifth in the B-final for an overall eleventh world place and qualified the boat for Tokyo 2020.

By the time of national team selections in 2021 for the delayed Tokyo Olympics, Bateman's strong performances in all three sculling boats at the 2021 Australian Championships saw her hold her seat in the double she'd qualified two years earlier. She was partnered with Tara Rigney a national U23 representative of 2019, who dominated the NSW state championships in 2021. Bateman & Rigney placed third in their heat, fifth in the semi-final and won the petite final for an overall seventh place finish at the Olympic regatta. They were coached by Ellen Randall.

In March 2022 Bateman was selected in the sculling squad of the broader Australian training team to prepare for the 2022 international season and the 2022 World Rowing Championships.   At the 2022 World Rowing Championships at Racize, she rowed in the Australian quad scull to an overall sixth place finish.

References

External links
 
 
 
 
 

1996 births
Living people
Australian female rowers
Olympic rowers of Australia
Rowers at the 2020 Summer Olympics
Rowers from Melbourne
People educated at Firbank Girls' Grammar School
Sportswomen from Victoria (Australia)